The Tupolev Tu-95 (NATO reporting name: "Bear") is a large, four-engine turboprop-powered strategic bomber and missile platform. First flown in 1952, the Tu-95 entered service with the Long-Range Aviation of the Soviet Air Forces in 1956 and was first used in combat in 2015. It is expected to serve the Russian Aerospace Forces until at least 2040.

A development of the bomber for maritime patrol is designated the Tu-142, while a passenger airliner derivative was called the Tu-114.

The aircraft has four Kuznetsov NK-12 engines with contra-rotating propellers. It is the only propeller-powered strategic bomber still in operational use today. The Tu-95 is one of the loudest military aircraft, particularly because the tips of the propeller blades move faster than the speed of sound. Its distinctive swept-back wings are set at an angle of 35°. The Tu-95 is the only propeller-driven aircraft with swept wings that has been built in large numbers.

Design and development 

The design bureau, led by Andrei Tupolev, designed the Soviet Union's first intercontinental bomber, the 1949 Tu-85, a scaled-up version of the Tu-4, a Boeing B-29 Superfortress copy. Other goals included the ability to carry an  load over the target.

Tupolev was faced with selecting a suitable type of powerplant: the Tu-4 showed that piston engines were not powerful enough for such a large aircraft, and the AM-3 jet engines for the proposed T-4 intercontinental jet bomber used too much fuel to give the required range. Turboprop engines were more powerful than piston engines and gave better range than the turbojets available at the time, and gave a top speed between the two. Turboprops were also initially selected for the Boeing B-52 Stratofortress to meet its long range requirement, and for the British long-range transport aircraft, the Saunders-Roe Princess, the Bristol Brabazon Mk 2 and the Bristol Britannia.

Tupolev proposed a turboprop installation and a Tu-95 design with this configuration was officially approved by the government on 11 July 1951. It used four Kuznetsov coupled turboprops, each fitted with two contra-rotating propellers with four blades each, with a nominal  power rating. The engine, advanced for its time, was designed by a German team of ex-Junkers prisoner-engineers under Ferdinand Brandner. The fuselage was conventional with a mid-mounted wing with 35 degrees of sweep, an angle that ensured that the main wing spar passed through the fuselage in front of the bomb bay. Retractable tricycle landing gear was fitted, with all three gear strut units retracting rearwards, with the main gear units retracting rearwards into extensions of the inner engine nacelles.

The Tu-95/I, with 2TV-2F engines, first flew in November 1952 with test pilot Alexey Perelet at the controls. After six months of test flights this aircraft suffered a propeller gearbox failure and crashed, killing Perelet. The second aircraft, Tu-95/II, used four 12,000 eshp Kuznetsov NK-12 turboprops which proved more reliable than the coupled 2TV-2F. After a successful flight testing phase, series production of the Tu-95 started in January 1956.

For a long time, the Tu-95 was known to U.S./NATO intelligence as the Tu-20. While this was the original Soviet Air Force designation for the aircraft, by the time it was being supplied to operational units it was already better known under the Tu-95 designation used internally by Tupolev, and the Tu-20 designation quickly fell out of use in the USSR. Since the Tu-20 designation was used on many documents acquired by U.S. intelligence agents, the name continued to be used outside the Soviet Union. These numbers had to be revised upward numerous times.

Like its American counterpart, the B-52, the Tu-95 has continued to operate in the Russian Air Force while several subsequent iterations of bomber design have come and gone. Part of the reason for this longevity was its suitability, like the B-52, for modification to different missions. Whereas the Tu-95 was originally intended to drop free-falling nuclear weapons, it was subsequently modified to perform a wide range of roles, such as the deployment of cruise missiles, maritime patrol (Tu-142), and even civilian airliner (Tu-114). An AWACS platform (Tu-126) was developed from the Tu-114. An icon of the Cold War, the Tu-95 has served not only as a weapons platform but as a symbol of Soviet and later Russian national prestige. Russia's air force has received the first examples of a number of modernised strategic bombers in Tu-95MSs following upgrade work. Enhancements have been confined to the bomber's electronic weapons and targeting systems. Modernization of the first batch was completed in March 2020.

Tu-116 

Designed as a stopgap in case the Tu-114A was not finished on time, two Tu-95 bombers were fitted with passenger compartments. Both aircraft had the same layout: office space, a passenger cabin consisting of two sections which could each accommodate 20 people in VIP seating, and the rest of the  cabin configured as a normal airliner. Both aircraft were eventually used as crew ferries by the various Tu-95 squadrons. One of these machines is preserved at Ulyanovsk Central Airport.

Modernization 
Starting in the 2000s, the Russian air force started to study different options for the modernisation of its Tu-95MS fleet. Even before the start of the modernisation program, in 2003 the aircraft were made compatible with the Kh-555 missile. Then, the proper modernisation program was initiated. Development officially started when a research and development contract was issued to Tupolev by the Russian Defence Ministry, on 23 December 2009. The modernisations are only applied to the Tu-95MS16s using the K-016 Sprut missile initialisation system, and not to the aircraft using the older K-012 Osina (the K-016 allows the use of longer-ranged Kh-55SM missiles); in other words, only the aircraft manufactured from 1986 onwards are modernised. In total, this represents a fleet of between 30 and 35 aircraft. The program is divided into two steps: the first one consists of making the aircraft compatible with Kh-101/102 cruise missiles. These are too big to fit in the internal missile bay; hence, new external hardpoints are added. A total of eight Kh-101/102s can be carried under four double missile pylons, in addition to six Kh-55/55SM/555s in the internal rotary missile launcher. Several pieces of equipment are also replaced in this first step of the modernisation, including the satellite signal reception system, the instrument landing system, and other navigation systems. The first Tu-95 modernized to carry the Kh-101/102 missiles was the Tu-95MS Saratov, rolled out at the Beriev aircraft plant in Taganrog in early 2015. It was transferred to the Russian Air Force in March 2015. Since 2015, the serial modernisation is carried out also by the Aviakor aircraft plant in Samara at a rate of three aircraft per year. The first Tu-95 modernized by Aviakor was the Tu-95MS Dubna, transferred to the Russian Air Force on 18 November 2015. In the future, Tu-95MSs are to be upgraded with the SVP-24 sighting and computing system from the Russian company Gefest & T.

The second step of the modernisation program is also the most extensive one, and is known as Tu-95MSM. It includes the installation of the new Novella NV1.021 passive electronically scanned array radar instead of the current Obzor-MS, a new S021 navigation system and the Meteor-NM2 airborne defense complex. In addition, the aircraft modernized to the "MSM" variant will be equipped with upgraded Kuznetsov NK-12MPM turboprop engines, together with new AV-60T propellers, reducing the vibration level by 50%. Lastly, the tail turret is deleted. The first Tu-95MSM made its maiden flight on 22 August 2020. A new contract on upgrading Tu-95MS strategic missile-carrying bombers to the Tu-95MSM level was signed in August 2021.

Operational history

Soviet Union 
The Tu-95RT variant in particular was a veritable icon of the Cold War as it performed a maritime surveillance and targeting mission for other aircraft, surface ships and submarines. It was identifiable by a large bulge under the fuselage, which reportedly housed a radar antenna that was used to search for and detect surface ships.

A series of nuclear surface tests were carried out by the Soviet Union in the early- to mid-1960s. On October 30, 1961, a modified Tu-95 carried and dropped the AN602 device named Tsar Bomba, which was the most powerful thermonuclear device ever detonated. Video footage of that particular test exists since the event was filmed for documentation purposes. The footage shows the specially adapted Tu-95V plane – painted with anti-flash white on its ventral surfaces – taking off carrying the bomb, in-flight scenes of the interior and exterior of the aircraft, and the detonation. The bomb was attached underneath the aircraft, which carried the weapon semi-externally since it could not be carried inside a standard Tu-95's bomb-bay, similar to the way the B.1 Special version of the Avro Lancaster did with the ten-tonne Grand Slam "earthquake bomb". Along with the Tsar Bomba, the Tu-95 proved to be a versatile bomber that would deliver the RDS-4 Tatyana (a fission bomb with a yield of forty-two kilotons), RDS-6S thermonuclear bomb, the RDS-37 2.9-megaton thermonuclear bomb, and the RP-30-32 200-kiloton bomb.

The early versions of this bomber lacked comfort for their crews. They had a dank and dingy interior, and there was neither a toilet nor a galley in the aircraft. Though the living conditions on the bomber were unsatisfactory, the crews would often take two 10-hour mission trips a week to ensure combat readiness. This gave an annual total of around 1,200 flight hours.

The bomber had the best crews available due to the nature of their mission. They would undertake frequent missions into the Arctic to practice transpolar strikes against the United States. Unlike their American counterparts, they never flew their missions carrying nuclear weapons. This hindered their mission readiness due to the fact that live ammunition had to come from special bunkers on the bases and loaded into the aircraft from the servicing trench below the bomb bay, a process that could take two hours.

During the Falklands War Tu-95s carried out intelligence gathering flights around Ascension Island.

Russia 

In 1992, newly independent Kazakhstan began returning the Tu-95 aircraft of the 79th Heavy Bomber Aviation Division at Dolon air base to the Russian Federation. The bombers joined those already at the Far Eastern Ukrainka air base.

On 17 August 2007, Russian President Vladimir Putin announced that Russia was resuming the strategic aviation flights stopped in 1991, sending its bombers on long-range patrols. Fighters from NATO members are often sent to intercept and escort Tu-95s as they perform their missions along the periphery of NATO airspace, often in close proximity to each other.

Russian Tu-95s reportedly took part in a naval exercise off the coasts of France and Spain in January 2008, alongside Tupolev Tu-22M3 "Backfire" strategic bombers and Beriev A-50 "Mainstay" airborne early-warning aircraft.

During the Russian Stability 2008 military exercise in October 2008, Tu-95MS aircraft fired live air-launched cruise missiles for the first time since 1984. The long range of the Kh-55 cruise missile means the Tu-95MS can once again serve as a strategic weapons system.

In July 2010, two Russian Tu-95MS strategic bombers set a world record for a non-stop flight for an aircraft in the class, when they spent more than 43 hours in the air. The main task was to check the performance of the aircraft during such a long flight, in particular monitoring the engines and other systems.

On 17 November 2015, Tu-95s had their combat debut, being employed for the first time in long-range airstrikes as part of the Russian military intervention in the Syrian Civil War. On 17 November 2016, modernized Tu-95MS strategic bombers performed their first combat deployment, launching the Kh-101 cruise missiles on several militant positions in Syria.

On 5 December 2017, two Tu-95MS strategic bombers and two Il-76MD transport aircraft landed for the first time at the Biak Air Base in Indonesia. During the course of their visit, the Tu-95 crews conducted their first patrol flights over the southern Pacific, staying airborne for more than eight hours.

Tu-95MS/MSM bombers reportedly took part in the opening assault on Ukraine during the initial phase of the 2022 Russian invasion of Ukraine on 24 February 2022. On 6 March 2022, according to Ukrainian sources, Tu-95MS and Tu-160 strategic bombers launched eight cruise missiles, presumably the Kh-101, at the Havryshivka Vinnytsia International Airport from the Black Sea area. On 26 June 2022, spokesman of the Ukrainian Air Force Yurii Ihnat reported four to six Kh-101 cruise missiles were launched by Tu-95MS and Tu-160 strategic bombers at Kyiv from the Caspian Sea area. The bombers reportedly flew from Astrakhan.

On 5 December 2022, explosions were reported at two Russian airbases: the one at Engels-2 reportedly damaged two Tu-95s. Subsequently on 6 December satellite photos show that one Tu-95MS BEAR-H had caught fire and had to be covered in foam. A Tu-22 was also damaged. The attack was carried out by modernised Tu-141 drones.

Incidents 
 On June 8, 2015, a Tu-95 ran off a runway at the Ukrainka bomber base and caught fire during take-off in the far eastern Amur region. As a result, one crew member was killed.

Variants

Tu-95/1 The first prototype powered by Kuznetsov 2TV-2F coupled turboprop engines.
Tu-95/2 The second prototype powered by Kuznetsov NK-12 turboprops.
Tu-95 Basic variant of the long-range strategic bomber and the only model of the aircraft never fitted with a nose refuelling probe. Known to NATO as the Bear-A.
Tu-95K Experimental version for air-dropping a MiG-19 SM-20 jet aircraft.
Tu-95K22 Conversions of the older Bear bombers, reconfigured to carry the Raduga Kh-22 missile and incorporating modern avionics. Known to NATO as the Bear-G.
Tu-95K/Tu-95KD Designed to carry the Kh-20 air-to-surface missile. The Tu-95KD aircraft were the first to be outfitted with nose probes. Known to NATO as the Bear-B.
 Modified and upgraded versions of the Tu-95K, most notable for their enhanced reconnaissance systems. These were in turn converted into the Bear-G configuration. Known to NATO as the Bear-C.
Tu-95LAL Experimental nuclear-powered aircraft project.
Tu-95M Modification of the serial Tu-95 with the NK-12M engines. 19 were built.
Tu-95M-55 Missile carrier.
Tu-95MRBear-A modified for photo-reconnaissance and produced for Soviet Naval Aviation. Known to NATO as the Bear-E.
Tu-95MS/Tu-95MS6/Tu-95MS16 Completely new cruise missile carrier platform based on the Tu-142 airframe. This variant became the launch platform of the Raduga Kh-55 cruise missile and put into serial production in 1981. Known to NATO as the Bear-H and was referred to by the U.S. military as a Tu-142 for some time in the 1980s before its true designation became known. Currently being modernized to carry the Kh-101/102 stealth cruise missiles. 21 aircraft have been modernized as of April 2019. In 2019–2020, 10 modernized Tu-95MS aircraft have joined the fleet. 4 aircraft were delivered in 2021.
Tu-95MS6 Capable of carrying six Kh-55, Kh-55SM or Kh-555 cruise missiles on a rotary launcher in the aircraft's weapons bay. 32 were built.
Tu-95MS16 Fitted with four underwing pylons in addition to the rotary launcher in the fuselage, giving a maximum load of 16 Kh-55s or 14 Kh-55SMs. 56 were built.
Tu-95MSM Modernization of the "Tu-95MS16" bombers, equipped with the new Novella-NV1.021 radar, SOI-021 information display system, Meteor-NM2 airborne defense complex and upgraded Kuznetsov NK-12MPM turboprop engines. First flight scheduled for end of 2019.
Tu-95N Experimental version for air-dropping an RS ramjet powered aircraft.
Tu-95RTs Variant of the basic Bear-A configuration, redesigned for maritime reconnaissance and targeting as well as electronic intelligence for service in the Soviet Naval Aviation. Known to NATO as the Bear-D.
Tu-95U Training variant, modified from surviving Bear-As but now all have been retired. Known to NATO as the Bear-T.
Tu-95V Special carrier aircraft to test-drop the largest thermonuclear weapon ever designed, the Tsar Bomba.
It was a high-altitude version of the Tupolev Tu-95 aircraft with high-altitude augmented turboprop TV-16 engines and with a new, enlarged-area wing. Plant tests of the aircraft were performed with non-high altitude TV-12 engines in 1955–1956.

Tu-95 derivatives
Tu-114 Airliner derivative of Tu-95.
Tu-116 Tu-95 fitted with passenger cabins as a stop-gap while the Tu-114 was being developed. 2 were converted.
Tu-126 AEW&C derivative of Tu-114, itself derived from the Tu-95.
Tu-142 Maritime reconnaissance/anti-submarine warfare derivative of Tu-95. Known to NATO as the Bear-F.

Several other modifications of the basic Tu-95/Tu-142 airframe have existed, but these were largely unrecognized by Western intelligence or never reached operational status in the Soviet military.

Operators

 Russian Aerospace Forces
 Russian Air Force – 55 Tu-95MS are in service .
 6950th Guards Air Base – Engels-2 (air base), Saratov Oblast
 184th Guards Heavy Bomber Aviation Regiment
 6952nd Air Base – Ukrainka (air base), Amur Oblast
 182nd Heavy Bomber Aviation Regiment
 79th Heavy Bomber Aviation Regiment
 43rd Center for Combat Application and Training of Aircrew for Long Range Aviation – Dyagilevo (air base), Ryazan Oblast
 2nd Instructor Heavy Bomber Aviation Regiment

Former operators

 Soviet Air Forces – aircraft were transferred to Russian and Ukrainian Air Forces after the dissolution of the Soviet Union.
 106th Heavy Bomber Air Division – the first Tu-95s division formed in 1956. The division commander was twice-Hero of the Soviet Union A. G. Molodchi.
 1006th Heavy Bomber Aviation Regiment – Uzyn Air Base, Kiev Oblast, Ukrainian SSR
 409th Heavy Bomber Aviation Regiment – Uzyn Air Base, Kiev Oblast, Ukrainian SSR
 182nd Guards Heavy Bomber Aviation Regiment – Mozdok, Severo-Osetinskaya ASSR
 79th Heavy Bomber Aviation Division – Dolon (air base), Semipalatinsk Oblast, Kazakh SSR
 1223rd Heavy Bomber Aviation Regiment
 1226th Heavy Bomber Aviation Regiment
 73rd Heavy Bomber Aviation Division – Ukrainka (air base), Amur Oblast, Russian SFSR
 40th Heavy Bomber Aviation Regiment – united with the 182nd TBAP in 1998 at the Ukrainka Air Base
 79th Heavy Bomber Aviation Regiment
 Soviet Naval Aviation
 392nd Separate Long-Range Reconnaissance Aviation Regiment – Kipelovo, Vologda Oblast, Russian SFSR
 304th Separate Long-Range Reconnaissance Aviation Regiment – Khorol Airfield, Primorsky Krai, Russian SFSR
 169th Independent Guards Mixed Aviation Regiment – Cam Ranh Base, Khánh Hòa Province, Vietnam

 Ukrainian Air Force – inherited 23–29 Tu-95MS aircraft after the collapse of the Soviet Union, and subsequently handed 3 Tu-95MS and 581 Kh-55 cruise missiles to Russia as exchange for gas debt relief in 2000; the remainder were scrapped under the Nunn–Lugar Cooperative Threat Reduction agreement led by the US.
 106th Heavy Bomber Air Division – Uzyn Air Base, Kyiv Oblast
 1006th Heavy Bomber Regiment
 Mykolaiv Aircraft Repair Plant – 2 Tu-95MS converted to ecological reconnaissance aircraft in storage, before they were sold for scrapping in 2013.
 Bila Tserkva Aircraft Repair Plant – 5 Russian Tu-95s scrapped at the plant, after an agreement between the Cabinet of Ministers of Ukraine and the Government of Russia.
 1 Tu-95MS in the Museum of Long Range Aviation in Poltava and 1 Tu-95 in Mykolaiv Oblast.

Specifications (Tu-95MS)

See also

References

Bibliography
 Bukharin, Oleg, Pavel L. Podvig and Frank von Hippel. Russian Strategic Nuclear Forces. Boston: MIT Press, 2004. .
 Duffy, Paul and Andrei Kandalov. Tupolev: The Man and His Aircraft. Shrewsbury, UK: Airlife, 1996. .
 Eden, Paul (editor). The Encyclopedia of Modern Military Aircraft. London: Amber Books, 2004. .
 Gordon, Yefim and Peter Davidson. Tupolev Tu-95 Bear. North Branch, Minnesota: Specialty Press, 2006. .
 Grant, R.G. and John R. Dailey. Flight: 100 Years of Aviation. Harlow, Essex: DK Adult, 2007. .

 Mladenov, Alexander. "Still Going Strong". Air International. Vol. 89, No. 2, August 2015. pp. 40–47. .
 Wilson, Stewart. Combat Aircraft since 1945. Fyshwick, Australia: Aerospace Publications, 2000. .

External links 

 Tu-95 Intercepts From The 1960s Till Today
 Tu-95МС

Tu-0095
1950s Soviet bomber aircraft
Four-engined tractor aircraft
Tupolev Tu-095
Four-engined turboprop aircraft
Articles containing video clips
High-wing aircraft
Aircraft first flown in 1952
Strategic bombers